John Clifford Hawkins was a lawyer and politician in New York City during the early 20th century. He served in the New York Assembly and represented Harlem as a New York City alderman.

Background

Hawkins was born in Middleburg, North Carolina on March 29, 1879, the son of John and Sara Hawkins. In 1903, he graduated from Lincoln University.  He studied law at New York University School of Law.

Career

He was a member of the New York State Assembly (New York Co., 21st D.) in 1919, 1920 and 1921. He was the second African-American New York assemblyman after Edward A. Johnson in 1918. 

In 1927, he was elected an Alderman of the City of New York, representing the 21st District. He was one of two African Americans serving as aldermen in 1929 and was reportedly offered the minority leadership post but turned it down.

See also
List of African-American officeholders (1900-1959)

Warren B. Douglass

References

1879 births
African-American lawyers
African-American state legislators in New York (state)
New York University School of Law alumni
People from Vance County, North Carolina
Year of death missing
Politicians from New York City
New York (state) lawyers
20th-century American lawyers
20th-century American politicians
20th-century African-American politicians
African-American men in politics